The 2018 Rolex Paris Masters was a professional men's tennis tournament played on indoor hard courts. It was the 46th edition of the tournament, and part of the World Tour Masters 1000 category of the 2018 ATP World Tour. It took place at the Palais omnisports de Paris-Bercy in Paris, France, between 29 October and 4 November 2018.

Points and prize money

Point distribution

Prize money

Singles main-draw entrants

Seeds
The following are the seeded players. Seedings are based on ATP rankings as of 22 October 2018. Rankings and points before are as of 29 October 2018. Points defending include points from the 2017 ATP Finals, which will be dropped at the end of the tournament.

† The player used an exemption to skip the tournament in 2017. Accordingly, points for his 18th best result are deducted instead.
‡ The player did not qualify for the tournament in 2017. Accordingly, points for his 18th best result are deducted instead.

Withdrawals

† del Potro is entitled to use an exemption to skip the tournament and substitute his 18th best result (20 points) in its stead.

Other entrants
The following players received wildcards into the singles main draw:
  Pierre-Hugues Herbert 
  Ugo Humbert 
  Jo-Wilfried Tsonga

The following player received entry as a special exempt:
  Mikhail Kukushkin

The following players received entry from the qualifying draw:
  Peter Gojowczyk
  Robin Haase
  Feliciano López
  Nicolas Mahut 
  Benoît Paire 
  João Sousa

The following players received entry as lucky losers:
  Matthew Ebden
  Malek Jaziri

Withdrawals
Before the tournament
  Chung Hyeon (Right Foot Injury) → replaced by  Jérémy Chardy
  Juan Martín del Potro → replaced by  Márton Fucsovics
  Kyle Edmund (Knee Injury) → replaced by  Matthew Ebden
  David Goffin → replaced by  Gilles Simon
  Nick Kyrgios → replaced by  Frances Tiafoe
  Rafael Nadal (Abdominal Injury) → replaced by  Malek Jaziri

During the tournament
  Márton Fucsovics (Hip Injury)
  Milos Raonic (Elbow Injury)

Retirements
  Matthew Ebden (Illness)
  John Millman (Back Injury)

Doubles main-draw entrants

Seeds

 1 Rankings are as of 22 October 2018

Other entrants
The following pairs received wildcards into the doubles main draw:
   Grégoire Barrère /  Adrian Mannarino 
   Julien Benneteau /  Lucas Pouille

The following pair received entry as alternates:
   Divij Sharan /  Artem Sitak

Withdrawals
Before the tournament
  Daniil Medvedev (Shoulder)

During the tournament
  Mate Pavić (Abdominal injury)

Finals

Singles

  Karen Khachanov defeated  Novak Djokovic, 7–5, 6–4

Doubles

  Marcel Granollers /  Rajeev Ram defeated  Jean-Julien Rojer /  Horia Tecău, 6–4, 6–4.

References

External links
 Official website
 ATP tournament profile